Krisztián Balázs (born 25 March 2002) is a Hungarian artistic gymnast. He participated in the 2018 Summer Youth Olympics and the 2019 Junior World Artistic Gymnastics Championships.

Career 

In 2016, he competed in the junior team competition at the 2016 European Men's Artistic Gymnastics Championships held in Bern, Switzerland.

At the 2018 Summer Youth Olympics held in Buenos Aires, Argentina, he won the silver medal in the floor exercise and the bronze medal in the horizontal bar. He also won the gold medal in the mixed multi-discipline team event. At the 2019 Junior World Artistic Gymnastics Championships in Győr, Hungary, he won the bronze medal in the horizontal bar. A month later, he won the bronze medal in the men's parallel bars event at the 2019 European Youth Summer Olympic Festival held in Baku, Azerbaijan.

In 2020, he won the silver medal in the junior men's team event at the 2020 European Men's Artistic Gymnastics Championships held in Mersin, Turkey. He also won the gold medal in the junior horizontal bar event and the bronze medal in the junior all-around event.

He competed at the 2021 European Artistic Gymnastics Championships held in Basel, Switzerland.

Gallery

References

External links 
 
 

Living people
2002 births
Gymnasts from Budapest
Hungarian male artistic gymnasts
Gymnasts at the 2018 Summer Youth Olympics
Medalists at the Junior World Artistic Gymnastics Championships
21st-century Hungarian people